Rabbi Yom-Tov Ehrlich (1914–1990) was a renowned Hasidic musician, composer, lyricist, recording artist, and popular entertainer known for his popular Yiddish music albums. He was born in a small village, Kozhan Gorodok, Russian Empire, and raised in a nearby village, Davyd-Haradok, Belarus (then Poland). He survived the Holocaust in Samarkand, Soviet Union. Later, he moved to Williamsburg, Brooklyn, New York. 

Ehrlich was born to a family of Karlin-Stoliner Hasidim. His grandfather, Yom Tov Simcha Ehrlich, was an aide to Rabbi Aharon of Karlin, an early leader of the Hasidic movement. Ehrlich himself was a Hasid of the late Rabbi Yochanan Perlow of Karlin.

Some of Ehrlich's favorite songs were later recorded by other popular Hasidic entertainers, such as Mordechai Ben David, Lipa Shmeltzer,Levy Falkowitz and Avraham Fried, although Ehrlich himself used Russian classical and folk melodies to his own Yiddish lyrics.

His most popular songs include: "Yakkob", the tale of a Jew in Uzbekistan during the Holocaust; "Shloof mein kind" ("Sleep, my child"), the song of a Jewish woman who finds a child alone in the woods during the Holocaust; and "Williamsburg", a song about Hasidic Williamsburg during the 1950s.

Discography
 The Wandering Jewish Folk Singer

Yiddish Nachas (1960) 
 Torah (1961)
 T'shuva (1962)
 Shema B'ni (1963)
 Ameritchka (1964)
 Emunah (1965)
 Shabbos (1967)
 Luksus (Double Album) (1967)
 Chevlei Moshiach (Double Album) (1969)
 Shabchi Yerushalayim (1970)
 Middois (1973)
 Dai (1974)
 Shelo Asani Goy (1975)
Journey Through Song 1 - Lamnatzeach B'naginos (1975)
Journey Through Song 2 - Mizmor L'sodah (1975)
Kol Mevaser (1977)
 Yetzias Mitzrayim (2 Volumes) (1978)
 Chessed
 Elliyohu Hanuvee
 A Shabbus Mitten Rebben
 Der Satmerer Rebbe (2 Volumes) (1981)
 Der Baal Shem Tov (2 Volumes)
Emunas Tzadikim
Shoshanas Yaakov
Ashreinu (2 Volumes)
Hallel
Rannenu Tzadikim (2 Volumes)
Modeh Ani
Bitachon

References

External links
 Brooklyn Rail about him
 another book chapter summary about him
 

Hasidic entertainers
Hasidic music
Yiddish-language singers
American Orthodox Jews
1914 births
1990 deaths
People from Williamsburg, Brooklyn
People from Mozyrsky Uyezd
Soviet emigrants to the United States